The Iris Nebula (also known as NGC 7023 and Caldwell 4) is a bright reflection nebula in the constellation Cepheus. The designation NGC 7023 refers to the open cluster within the larger reflection nebula designated LBN 487.

The nebula, which shines at magnitude +6.8, is illuminated by a magnitude +7.4 star designated SAO 19158. It is located near the Mira-type variable star T Cephei, and near the bright magnitude +3.23 variable star Beta Cephei (Alfirk). It lies 1,300 light-years away and is six light-years across.

Notes

References

External links

 
 SEDS – NGC 7023
 VizieR – NGC 7023
 NED – NGC 7023
 Dark Atmospheres Photography – Iris Nebula NGC 7023
 See NGC 7023 in WorldWide Telescope

NGC objects
004b
Cepheus (constellation)
Reflection nebulae
Diffuse nebulae